Sam El Nasa (born April 25, 1984 in Cambodia) is a footballer for Preah Khan Reach in Cambodian League. He plays as a striker for club.

International career

International goals
Scores and results list Cambodia's goal tally first.

References

External links
 

1984 births
Living people
Cambodian footballers
Cambodia international footballers
Cambodian expatriate footballers
Preah Khan Reach Svay Rieng FC players
Association football forwards